Yeoju Station is the southern terminus of the Seoul Metropolitan Subway Gyeonggang Line. It is located at 80 Gyodongno, Gyo-dong, Yeoju, Gyeonggi, South Korea.

Station Layout

References

External links

Metro stations in Yeoju
Seoul Metropolitan Subway stations
Railway stations opened in 2016
Gyeonggang Line
Korail stations
2016 establishments in South Korea